B. R. Ambedkar was a 20th-century Indian polymath and social reformer who is known as the father of the Constitution of India.

Ambedkar or Dr. Ambedkar may refer to:

Film and television 
Dr. B. R. Ambedkar (film)
Dr. Babasaheb Ambedkar (film)
Ramabai Bhimrao Ambedkar (film)
Dr. Babasaheb Ambedkar - Mahamanvachi Gauravgatha

Memorials and Monuments 
Ambedkar Memorial Park
Dr. B. R. Ambedkar Memorial Park
Statue of Equality (Ambedkar)
Dr. Ambedkar Mani Mandapam

Organisations 
Ambedkar National Congress
Ambedkar Samaj Party
Ambedkar Students' Association
Ambedkarite Party of India
Birsa Ambedkar Phule Students' Association

Places 
Ambedkar Nagar (Delhi Assembly constituency)
Ambedkar Nagar (Lok Sabha constituency)
Ambedkar Nagar district
Ambedkar Nagar, Jodhpur
Dr. Ambedkar Nagar

Education 
Ambedkar College
Ambedkar Institute of Advanced Communication Technologies and Research
Ambedkar University Delhi
Baba Saheb Dr. Bhim Rao Ambedkar College of Agricultural Engineering and Technology
Babasaheb Bhimrao Ambedkar Bihar University
Babasaheb Bhimrao Ambedkar University
Dr. Ambedkar College, Nagpur
Dr. Ambedkar Government Arts College
Dr. Ambedkar Government Law College, Chennai
Dr. Ambedkar Institute of Technology
Dr. B. R. Ambedkar Institute of Technology
Dr. B. R. Ambedkar National Institute of Technology Jalandhar
Dr. B. R. Ambedkar Satabarshiki Mahavidyalaya
Dr. B.R. Ambedkar College
Dr. B.R. Ambedkar National Law University
Dr. B.R. Ambedkar Open University
Dr. B.R. Ambedkar University of Social Sciences
Dr. B.R. Ambedkar University, Srikakulam
Dr. Babasaheb Ambedkar College of Arts, Commerce and Science
Dr. Babasaheb Ambedkar Marathwada University
Dr. Babasaheb Ambedkar National Institute of Social Sciences
Dr. Babasaheb Ambedkar Open University
Dr. Babasaheb Ambedkar Technological University
Dr. Bhim Rao Ambedkar College
Dr. Bhimrao Ambedkar Law University
Dr. Bhimrao Ambedkar Rajkiya Mahavidyalaya, Mainpuri
Dr. Bhimrao Ambedkar University
Kultali Dr. B. R. Ambedkar College
Tamil Nadu Dr. Ambedkar Law University
Tripura Medical College & Dr. B.R. Ambedkar Memorial Teaching Hospital

Structures 
Ambedkar Nagar Hospital
Ambedkar Stadium
Bharat Ratna Dr. Babasaheb Ambedkar Stadium
Dr. Bhimrao Ambedkar International Sports Stadium
Dr. Bhimrao Ambedkar Stadium

Transportation 
Ambedkar Nagar monorail station
Dr. Ambedkar Nagar railway station
Dr. Bhimrao Ambedkar Airstrip, Meerut
Dr. B. R. Ambedkar Metro station, Vidhana Soudha, Bengaluru
Dr. Babasaheb Ambedkar International Airport, Nagpur

Other uses 
Ambedkar Jayanti
Ambedkar family
Ambedkar controversial cartoon
Dr. Ambedkar National Award
Vandalism of Ambedkar statues
Ambedkarite

People with the surname 
 Anandraj Ambedkar (born 1967), Indian politician
 Bhimrao Ambedkar (Uttar Pradesh politician), Indian politician
 Prakash Ambedkar (born 1954), Indian politician and lawyer
 Ramabai Ambedkar, first wife of B. R. Ambedkar
 Savita Ambedkar, Indian activist and second wife of B. R. Ambedkar
 Yashwant Ambedkar, Indian politician and son of B. R. Ambedkar

See also 
 List of things named after B. R. Ambedkar
Babasaheb
Bhim (disambiguation)
Bhimrao